Hemibagrus furcatus is a species of bagrid catfish found in Sabah, Malaysia.

References

Bagridae
Fish of Asia
Fish of Malaysia
Taxa named by Heok Hee Ng
[Category:Taxa named by Keith M. Martin-Smith]]
[Category:Taxa named by Ng Peter Kee Lin]]
Fish described in 2000